The following is a list of notable software packages and applications licensed under an open-source license or in the public domain for use in the health care industry.

Public health and biosurveillance 
Epi Info is public domain statistical software for epidemiology developed by Centers for Disease Control and Prevention.
Spatiotemporal Epidemiological Modeler is a tool, originally developed at IBM Research, for modelings and visualizing the spread of infectious diseases. It is maintained by the Eclipse Foundation and available under terms of the Eclipse Public License.

Electronic records and medical practice management

Health system management 
 iHRIS is an integrated Human Resource Information System developed by IntraHealth International under USAID-funded CapacityPlus project and deployed in more than 20 countries in the world. iHRIS is distributed under the GNU GPL.
 DHIS is a district health management information system and data warehouse. DHIS2 is released under the BSD license.
 HRHIS is a human resource for health information system for management of human resources for health developed by University of Dar es Salaam college of information and communication technology, Department of Computer Science and Engineering, for Ministry of Health and Social Welfare (Tanzania) and funded by the Japan International Cooperation Agency (JICA).

Disease management 
Breathing Games is a series of research-backed, co-created games to prevent, diagnose and treat chronic respiratory diseases. They are released under the Peer Production licence.
Nightscout is a collection of software tools, including mobile clients, to enable DIY cloud-based continuous glucose monitoring "…for informational and educational purposes." Individual components are available under various open-source licenses, including the GNU GPL, GNU AGPL, MIT License, and BSD licenses.

Imaging/visualization 

CamBA is a collection of neuroimaging pipelines distributed under the GNU GPL.
Drishti is a volumetric visualization package for viewing computer tomography data.  Able to import DICOM image stacks. It is available under the MIT license.
Endrov Image and data viewer and editor. It is available under the BSD license.
GIMIAS is a workflow-oriented environment focused on biomedical image computing and simulation. It is available under a BSD-style license.
Ginkgo CADx Cross-platform open source DICOM viewer and dicomizer. It is available under the GNU LGPL.
Insight Segmentation and Registration Toolkit (ITK) v4.0+ is released under the Apache license.
InVesalius 3D medical imaging reconstruction software. It is available under the GNU GPL. 
ITK-SNAP Interactive software for 3D image navigation, annotation, and automatic segmentation. It is available under the GNU GPL.
Orthanc – Lightweight, RESTful DICOM server for medical imaging. It is available under the GNU GPL with OpenSSL exception.
ParaView large-scale visualization tool. It is available under the BSD license.
3DSlicer Platform for medical image visualization and algorithm development. DICOM support, segmentation and registration, Diffusion MRI processing, and image guided surgery support. It is available under a BSD-style license.
Voreen volume rendering engine—a library for visually exploring volume data sets. DICOM is supported and Voreen is used in medical visualization as well as for visualizing electron microscopy data. It is available under the GNU GPL.
VTK is a visualization toolkit available under the BSD license.
 Studierfenster (StudierFenster) is a free, non-commercial Open Science client/server-based Medical Imaging Processing (MIP) online framework.

Medical information systems 
Caisis is a web-based information system for the storage and analysis of cancer patient data intended to bridge the gap between clinic and research. It is available under the GNU GPL.
cTAKES ("clinical Text Analysis Knowledge Extraction Software") is a natural language processing system for extracting information from electronic medical record clinical free-text, an Apache top level project (TLP) since 2013, developed by the Mayo Clinic and others. It is available under the Apache license.

Research 

Galaxy is a web platform for data-intensive biology using geographically-distributed supercomputers.
LabKey Server is an extensible platform for integrating, analyzing and sharing all types of biomedical research data.  It provides secure, web-based access to research data and includes a customizable data processing pipeline. It is distributed under the Apache license.

Mobile devices 
OpenAPS is a set of development tools and documentation to support a DIY implementation of an artificial pancreas for people with Type 1 Diabetes. Common setups include the interfacing of CGMs, Insulin Pumps, and Raspberry Pi devices. It is released under the MIT license, but compatible medical devices are proprietary.
Ushahidi allows people to submit crisis information through text messaging using a mobile phone, email or web form. Displays information in map view. It is released under the GNU Affero General Public License, but some libraries use different licenses.

Out-of-the-box distributions 
 BioLinux
 Debian-Med is a Debian Pure Blend for use in medical and biomedical settings.
 Ubuntu-Med

Interoperability 
Mirth is an open source cross-platform HL7 interface engine that enables bi-directional sending of HL7 messages between systems and applications over multiple transports. It is available under the Mozilla Public License.

Specifications 
 Continuity of Care Document
 Fast Healthcare Interoperability Resources (FHIR) is a Health Level 7 interoperability specification that defines JSON and XML data formats and a RESTful API. It is available under the CC0 license.
 openEHR is an open standard specification in health informatics that describes the management and storage, retrieval and exchange of health data in electronic health records (EHRs) following a two-level modeling paradigm. The OpenEHR base specification is available under the Creative Commons Attribution-ShareAlike 3.0 Unported license.

See also 

 Electronic medical record
 eHealth
 Gello Expression Language
 Health informatics
 Hospital information systems
 List of freeware health software
 List of biomedical cybernetics software
 List of open-source bioinformatics software
 List of open-source health hardware
 mHealth

References

Further reading 

  
  

 Open source healthcare
 
Healthcare